Zurmat is the main town of Zurmat District in Paktia Province, Afghanistan. Zurmat is the largest city of Paktia Province, while Zurmat District, with a population of 109,805, is also the most populous district of the province.

Climate

Notable people
 Rahmat Shah

See also
 Khost
 Loya Paktia

References

Populated places in Paktia Province